Kajohn Punnaves  is a Thai retired football forward who played for Thailand in the 1992 Asian Cup.

External links

Kajohn Punnaves
Association football forwards
Year of birth missing
Kajohn Punnaves